is a single by Puffy AmiYumi released in 2005.

"Hajimari no uta" was used as the ending theme song for the Japanese version of Pokémon: Lucario and the Mystery of Mew and several ads for Daihatsu in their "Move Latte" campaign

Track listing 

 はじまりのうた (Hajimari no uta)
 ナイスバディ (Nice Buddy)
 はじまりのうた　オリジナルカラオケ (Hajimari no uta  Original Karaoke)
 ナイスバディ　オリジナルカラオケ (Original Karaoke)

References

2005 singles
Puffy AmiYumi songs
Japanese film songs
Songs written for animated films
Song articles with missing songwriters
2005 songs